Wasinger is a German surname. Notable people with this surname include:

 Barbara Wasinger, American politician
 Mark Wasinger (born 1961),  American baseball player
 Tom Wasinger, American audio engineer and music producer
 Michael Wasinger, American Civil Engineer

German-language surnames

Surnames of German origin
Toponymic surnames